The Dirección General de Aviación Civil  (DGAC) is a division of Spain's Ministry of Public Works.

Its office is in the Nuevos Ministerios complex (Paseo de la Castellana, 67) in Madrid.

It is the former civil aviation authority of Spain. The current authority, the Spanish Aviation Safety and Security Agency, was established in 2008 and is attached to the DGAC.

References

External links

Dirección General de Aviación Civil  

Aviation in Spain